Hibaq Jama is a Somali-British politician. She is a Labour Party Ward Councillor representing the Lawrence Hill neighbourhood in Bristol. Jama was elected to office in May 2013, becoming the city's first Somali councillor.

References

External links
Labour Bristol - Hibaq Jama

Living people
English people of Somali descent
Ethnic Somali people
Somalian politicians
Somalian emigrants to the United Kingdom
Councillors in Bristol
Labour Party (UK) councillors
Year of birth missing (living people)